Harpalus luteicornis is a species of ground beetle native to the Palearctic realm, including Europe and the Near East. In Europe, it is found in mostly Central and Eastern part of the continent. It is found in the following European countries or unions: Austria, Baltic states, Belarus, Benelux, Bosnia and Herzegovina, Croatia, France, Germany, Hungary, Liechtenstein, Moldova, Poland, Romania, Russia, Scandinavia (except for Denmark), Slovakia, Slovenia, Switzerland, and Ukraine. It is also exists in Mongolia.

Description

Distribution and threat level
The species is considered to be rare in Flanders, Belgium and throughout the nation. It was put on Red List in Belgium on September 22, 1980.

References

External links
 Female Harpalus luteicornis

luteicornis
Beetles of Europe
Beetles described in 1812
Taxa named by Caspar Erasmus Duftschmid